The Emilie Plantation is a Southern plantation with a historic house located in Garyville, Louisiana, USA. It has been listed on the National Register of Historic Places since January 13, 1989.

"Emilie" was constructed in 1882 by Adelard Millet for Leonce Chauff. It was named for Leonce's younger sister.  The home was purchased in 1997 by the Baloney family, whose ancestors once worked as slaves on the plantation

References

Plantations in Louisiana
Houses in St. John the Baptist Parish, Louisiana
Houses on the National Register of Historic Places in Louisiana
National Register of Historic Places in St. John the Baptist Parish, Louisiana
1882 establishments in Louisiana